Caribbean Islands National Wildlife Complex is an administrative unit of the United States Fish and Wildlife Service which oversees National Wildlife Refuges in Puerto Rico, the U.S. Virgin Islands, and Navassa Island of the U.S. Minor Outlying Islands. The NWR complex also manages the reintroduction of the critically endangered Puerto Rican parrot into the wild.

Components

Puerto Rico 
 Cabo Rojo National Wildlife Refuge
 Culebra National Wildlife Refuge
 Desecheo National Wildlife Refuge
 Laguna Cartagena National Wildlife Refuge
 Vieques National Wildlife Refuge

U.S. Minor Outlying Islands 
 Navassa Island National Wildlife Refuge

U.S. Virgin Islands 
 Buck Island National Wildlife Refuge
 Green Cay National Wildlife Refuge
 Sandy Point National Wildlife Refuge

Caribbean Ecological Services Field Office 
The Caribbean Ecological Services Field Office was established in 1974 as part of the U.S. Fish and Wildlife Service’s Southeast Region (Region 4). This organization within the Caribbean Islands National Wildlife Refuge Complex has jurisdiction over Federal Trust Species (federally listed endangered species, including migratory birds and inter-jurisdictional fish populations) and Strategic Habitat Conservation programs. The field office is based in Cabo Rojo, Puerto Rico, and although the office is not open to the general public it also hosts the Cabo Rojo National Wildlife Refuge Visitor Center.

Gallery

See also
 List of National Wildlife Refuges of the United States

References

External links
 Caribbean Islands National Wildlife Complex official website

 
Protected areas established in 1974